Rodrigo de Esparza (13?-1423) was a Basque nobleman, Mosén and Chamberlain of King Charles III of Navarre.

Biography 

Born in Navarra. Mosén Rodrigo de Esparza was benefited by the King, who awarded him the annual revenues of the cities of Cintruénigo and Arguedas. He also was granted the right of patronage on the churches of Ezcároz, Esparza, Sarriés and Ibilcieta (Merindad de Sangüesa).

In 1390, Rodrigo de Esparza was the head of the Alcaldia, in Castle of Cintruénigo (Merindad de Tudela).

Esparza had a son Ramón de Esparza, Lord of the palace Esparza, who served as Captain of the Navarrese domains in Cherbourg (Normandy).

References

External links 
navarchivo.com

1423 deaths
14th-century nobility from the Kingdom of Navarre
15th-century nobility from the Kingdom of Navarre